Propata is a comune (municipality) in the Metropolitan City of Genoa in the Italian region Liguria, located about  northeast of Genoa.

The parish church of St. Lawrence houses a wooden statue by Anton Maria Maragliano.

References

See also
 Parco naturale regionale dell'Antola

Cities and towns in Liguria